ICA, Ica, or ica may refer to:

Companies and organizations
 Empresas ICA, a Mexican construction company
 ICA AB, a Swedish retail food business, formerly named ICA Ahold AB
 Indoor Cricket Australia
 Informatics Corporation of America, a private health information technology company
 Innovative Communications Alliance, between Microsoft and Nortel
 Institute of Combinatorics and its Applications, in Winnipeg, Canada
 Institute of Cultural Affairs International, an international non-profit organization
 Insulation Council of Australia and New Zealand, an industry trade group
 Interbank Card Association, now known as Mastercard
 Interfaculty Committee Agraria, an association of over 60 biological science universities
 Intermuseum Conservation Association
 , Internationale Camera Actiengesellschaft, German camera maker that became Zeiss Ikon
 International Cartographic Association
 International Chiropractors Association
 International Clarinet Association
 International Co-operative Alliance, the worldwide umbrella body for co-operatives
 International Commission for Acoustics
 International Communication Association
 International Congress of Actuaries
 International Congress of Americanists
 International Cooperation Administration, a United States government agency concerned with international development 
 International Council on Archives
 Irish Citizen Army, an organization which lasted up to 1916 to rid Ireland of British rule
 Irish Countrywomen's Association
 Islamic Cultural Association (Hong Kong)

Cultural centres and museums
Institute of Contemporary Art (disambiguation), several cultural centres and museums, including:
 Institute of Contemporary Arts, London, UK

Government and law
 Immigration and Checkpoints Authority, in Singapore
 Interconnect agreement, between a utility and a customer
 International Coffee Agreement, a UN pact establishing the International Coffee Organization
 International Court of Arbitration
 Interstate Commerce Act, US legislation establishing the regulatory Interstate Commerce Commission
 Investment Canada Act
 Islamic Consultative Assembly, the main legislative body of the Iranian government

Places
 Ica, Peru, a city in southern Peru
 Ica Province, containing the city
 Ica Region, containing the province
 Ica River, passing through the city
 Içá River, Brazil, also known as the Putumayo River, a tributary of the Amazon

Schools
 Immaculate Conception Academy, Philippines
 Instituto Coreano Argentino, Buenos Aires, Argentina
 International Christian Academy, an American boarding school in Bouaké, Ivory Coast (Côte d'Ivoire)
 Irlam and Cadishead Academy, England
 Islamitisch College Amsterdam, Netherlands
 Ivy Collegiate Academy, Taiwan

Sports
 ICA, official team code for Israel Start-Up Nation, a professional cycling team, formerly Israel Cycling Academy
 Intercontinental A, a kart racing class for top drivers aged 15 and up
 International Cycling Association, the first international body for cycle racing

Technology
 Independent component analysis, in signal processing and statistical data analysis
 Independent Computing Architecture, a proprietary protocol for an application server system

Other uses
 ICa (card), a smart card ticketing system for public transport in Kanazawa, Japan
 Ica language, a Magdalenic Chibchan language
 Islet cell antibodies test, a test for latent autoimmune diabetes

See also
 Immaculate Conception Academy (disambiguation)
 International Christian Academy (disambiguation)